Neil Evans may refer to:

Neil Evans (footballer), former Australian rules footballer
Neil Evans (presenter), former Fox Sports television presenter

See also
Neal Evans, entrepreneur